"Diamonds" is the first single from Fabolous' album From Nothin' to Somethin' (2007). The song features Young Jeezy and a songwriting credit from Yung Berg. Coincidentally, the voice sampled on the "Diamonds" chorus is also Young Jeezy, and it is a line from the another Fabolous song "Do the Damn Thing" from his previous album Real Talk.

The original version of the song featured Lil Wayne, but was changed due to Def Jam Recordings wanting to have a fellow Def Jam artist on the song.  Fabolous confirmed he was shooting a video for the song on his Myspace page. The song was produced by Steve Morales. The video for Diamonds is available on YouTube.

The single was released through iTunes on April 3, 2007. On the issue date of April 21, 2007 the single debuted on the Billboard Hot 100 at number 83. This song samples Jay-Z's line, "said she loved my necklace, started relaxing, now that's what the fuck I call a chain reaction" from the 1998 Jermaine Dupri song, "Money Ain't a Thang".

Music video
The video features cameos from Blood Raw, Red Cafe and Slick Pulla.

Charts

Remixes and freestyles
"Diamonds on My Damn Chain (RMX)" featuring Remy Ma, Lil Wayne
"Diamonds on My Damn Chain (RMX)(2)" featuring Red Cafe
"Diamonds on My Damn Chain (RMX)(3)" featuring Young Jeezy, Lil Wayne
"Diamonds on My Damn Chain (RMX)(4)" by Lil Wayne
"Diamonds on My Damn Chain (Mega RMX)(5)" featuring Young Jeezy, Lil Wayne, Remy Ma, Red Cafe

Lil Flip has recorded a freestyle, and Jody Breeze has also recorded a freestyle entitled "Blow You Out Ya Frame".

References

2007 singles
Fabolous songs
Jeezy songs
Songs written by Jeezy
Songs written by Fabolous
2007 songs
Def Jam Recordings singles
Songs written by Hitmaka